Kesharbai Kshirsagar (1930–2006) was an Indian politician and three-time member of the Lok Sabha.

Early life
Kesharbai was born in Nimgaon Mhalungi village of Pune district on 29 March 1930.

Career
Known for her social work, Kshirsagar was elected the sarpanch of Rajuri village (Beed) in 1962 and the chairman of panchayat samiti in 1967. She entered the Maharashtra Legislative Assembly in 1972 as an Indian National Congress (INC) politician representing Chausala and served on its Committee on Public Undertakings.

INC (I) made Kshirsagar its official candidate from Beed constituency during the 1980 Indian general election. She won the seat, defeating her nearest rival by a difference of 67,503 votes and became a member of the 7th Lok Sabha (1980–84). She was re-elected in 1984 and 1991. As an MP, she served on various parliamentary committees, including the one for official languages. Later Kshirsagar joined the Nationalist Congress Party (NCP).

Personal life
At the age of 15, Kesharbai was married to Sonajirao Kshirsagar. They had 8 children and one of their sons, Jaydutt Kshirsagar, was elected to the Maharashtra Legislative Assembly in 1990. She was fondly called Kesharkaku and died on 4 October 2006 at a hospital in Mumbai.

References

1930 births
2006 deaths
Politicians from Pune
Lok Sabha members from Maharashtra
India MPs 1980–1984
India MPs 1984–1989
India MPs 1991–1996
Women members of the Lok Sabha
Indian National Congress politicians from Maharashtra
Maharashtra MLAs 1972–1978
Nationalist Congress Party politicians from Maharashtra
People from Beed district
Maharashtra MLAs 1967–1972
Women members of the Maharashtra Legislative Assembly